Zulueta is a locality located in the municipality of Noáin, in Navarre province, Spain, Spain. As of 2020, it has a population of 291.

Geography 
Zulueta is located 13km southeast of Pamplona.

References

Populated places in Navarre